The Battle of La Suffel was a French victory over Austrian forces of the Seventh Coalition and the last French pitched battle victory in the Napoleonic Wars. It was fought on 28 June 1815 at Souffelweyersheim and Hoenheim, near Strasbourg.

During the Hundred Days, General Jean Rapp rallied to Napoleon Bonaparte and was given command of the V Corps (also known as the Army of the Rhine), consisting of about 20,000 men. He was ordered to observe the border near Strasbourg, and to defend the Vosges. Ten days after Waterloo (in which his corps took no part), he met the III Corps of the Austrian Upper Rhine Army under the command of the Crown Prince of Württemberg near Strasbourg and defeated them at the Battle of La Suffel.

Notes

References

Further reading

External links

Conflicts in 1815
Battles of the Napoleonic Wars
Battles involving France
1815 in France
Hundred Days
June 1815 events